Eleme may refer to:

Eleme, Ghana, a town 
Eleme, Mali, a town 
Eleme, Rivers, Nigeria, a Local Government Area
Eleme people, a people in Rivers State, Nigeria
Eleme language, a language spoken by the Eleme people
Ele.me, a Chinese online food delivery platform